The nine familial exterminations or nine kinship exterminations or execution of nine relations, also known by the names zuzhu ("family execution") and miezu ("family extermination"), was the most severe punishment for a capital offense in premodern China, Korea, and Vietnam. A collective form of kin punishment typically associated with offenses such as treason, the punishment involved the execution of all relatives of an individual, which were categorized into nine groups. Nine exterminations were often done by slow slicing. The occurrence of this punishment was somewhat rare, with relatively few sentences recorded throughout history.

Punishment 
The punishment involved the execution of close and extended family members. These included:
The criminal's living parents
The criminal's living grandparents
Any children the criminal may have, over a certain age (varying over different eras, children below that age becoming slaves) and—if married—their spouses.
Any grandchildren the criminal may have, over a certain age (again with enslavement for the underaged) and—if married—their spouses.
Siblings and siblings-in-law (the siblings of the criminal and that of his or her spouse, in the case where he or she is married)
Uncles and aunts of the criminal, as well as their spouses
The criminal's cousins (in the case of Korea, this included up to second and third cousins)
The criminal's spouse
The criminal's spouse's parents
The criminal

Confucian principles also played a major role in the extent of the punishment. The killing of children was disapproved under Mencius' principle that "being offspring is not a sin" (Classical Chinese: 罪人不孥), so that children under a certain age were often spared execution.

History

Ancient China
The punishment by nine exterminations is usually associated with the tyrannical rulers throughout Chinese history who were prone to use inhumane methods of asserting control (such as slow slicing, or "death by ten thousand cuts"). The first written account of the concept is in the Classic of History, a historical account of the Shang (1600 BC – 1046 BC) and Zhou (1045 BC – 256 BC) Dynasties, where it is recorded that prior to a military battle, officers would threaten their subordinates that they would exterminate their families if they refused to obey orders.

From the Spring and Autumn period (770BC–403BC), there are records of exterminations of "three clans". A notable case was under the State of Qin in 338 BC: lawmaker Shang Yang's entire family was killed by order of King Huiwen of Qin, while Shang Yang himself was sentenced to death by being drawn and quartered. This was an ironic occurrence as it was Shang Yang who formulated such a punishment into Qin law in the first place, being commonly recorded as a lawmaker who used excessive punishments.

Early imperial era
During the Qin Dynasty (221 BC – 207 BC), punishments became even more rigorous under the first emperor of unified China, Qin Shi Huang (259 BC – 210 BC). In order to uphold his rule, strict laws were enforced, where deception, libel, and the study of banned books became punishable by familial extermination. This increase in tyranny only helped to speed up the overthrow of the Qin Dynasty. The Han Dynasty (202 BC – 220 AD), although it inherited the concept of family execution, was more moderate in inflicting such severe punishments. In many cases, the Han Emperor would retract the sentence, and so family executions were much rarer than under the Qin Dynasty. During the Tang Dynasty (618–907), the family punishment was not abolished, but it was only applied to those who plotted against the rule of the Emperor. By this time, the penalty had become more regulated and different; from the Tang Code, the sentence involved the death of parents, children over the age of sixteen, and other close kindred, and was only applied to the offenses of treason and rebellion.

Late imperial era
During the Ming (1368–1644) and Qing (1644–1912) Dynasties, the breadth of family extermination was increased. Under the Hongwu Emperor (r. 1368 – 98), those committing rebellion and treason were punished by having their parents, grandparents, brethren (by birth, as well as "sworn brothers"), children, grandchildren, those living with the criminal regardless of surname, uncles, and the children of brethren put to death, as well as death for the rebels themselves by slow slicing or lingchi. The number of sentences during the Ming were higher than that of the Tang, due to the policy of "showing mercy beneath the sword", while females were given the choice to become slaves rather than be killed. A rare case was Fang Xiaoru (1357–1402), whose students and friends were also executed as the 10th family by the Yongle Emperor (r. 1402 – 1424), the only case where "ten exterminations" was officially sentenced and carried out. The punishment by family extermination during the Qing Dynasty was a direct imitation of the regulation under the Ming.

On 1 November 1728, after the Qing reconquest of Lhasa in Tibet, several Tibetan rebels were sliced to death by Qing Manchu officers and officials. The Qing Manchu President of the Board of Civil Office, Jalangga, Mongol sub-chancellor Sen-ge, and brigadier-general Manchu Mala ordered the Tibetan rebels Lum-pa-nas and Na-p'od-pa to be sliced to death. They ordered gZims-dpon C'os-ac'ad (Hsi-mu-pen ch'ui-cha-t'e), son of Lum-pa-nas and rNog Tarqan bsKal-bzajn-c'os-adar and dKon-mc'og-lha-sgrub (Kun-ch'u-k'o-la-ku-pu) and dGa'-ldan-p'un-ts'ogs (K'a-erh-tan-p'en-ch'u-k'o), sons of Na-p'od-pa to be beheaded. Byams-pa (Cha-mu-pa) and his brother Lhag-gsan (La-k'o-sang) and their brothers, daughters, wives, and mother were exiled after their father sByar-ra-nas was beheaded. The Manchus wrote that they "set an example" by forcing the Tibetans to publicly watch the executions of Tibetan rebels of slicing like Na-p'od-pa since they said it was the Tibetan's nature to be cruel. The exiled Tibetans were enslaved and given as slaves to soldiers in Ching-chou (Jingzhou), K'ang-zhou (Kangzhou), and Chiang-ning (Jiangning) in the marshall-residences there. The Tibetan rNam-rgyal-grva-ts'an college administrator (gner-adsin) and sKyor'lun Lama were tied together with Lum-pa-nas and Na-p'od-pa on 4 scaffolds (k'rims-sin) to be sliced. The Manchus used muskets to fire 3 salvoes and then the Manchus strangled the 2 Lamas while slicing Lum-pa-nas and Na-p'od-pa to death while they beheaded the 13 other rebel leaders. The Tibetan population was depressed by the scene and the writer continued to feel sad as he described it 5 years later. All relatives of the Tibetan rebels including little children were executed by the Qing Manchus except the exiled and deported family of sByar-ra-ba who were condemned to be slaves. The public executions spectacle worked on the Tibetans since they were "cowed into submission" by the Qing. Even the Tibetan collaborator with the Qing, Polhané Sönam Topgyé (P'o-lha-nas), felt sad at his fellow Tibetans being executed in this manner and he prayed for them. All of this was included in a report by General Yue Zhongqi and sent to the Qing emperor at the time, the Yongzheng Emperor.

Punishment by nine exterminations was abolished near the end of the Qing Dynasty, and was officially repealed by the imperial government in 1905.

In other countries
There were various ethical judgements regarding group punishment in ancient times. It was typically seen as a tyrannical method of rule, unjustly punishing innocent family members for the crime of a relative. Like all forms of collective punishment, it was also intended as a dreadful deterrent for the worst crimes, rather than merely as a form of revenge.

In ancient Korea, this punishment was applied during the reign of King Jinpyeong of Silla (579-632) when conspirator Ichan Chilsuk (이찬 칠숙) and his entire family and relatives to the ninth degree were put to death.

In ancient Vietnam, the most prominent example is the execution of most of the family members of Nguyễn Trãi (1380–1442), an official who was wrongly accused of killing the King. He had his entire family executed.

"Nine tribes" 
In ancient times, there were nine different relations (or guanxi) which an individual had with other people, which were referred to as the "family" or "tribe" during that period. These relations, under Confucian principles, were bonded by filial piety. Because members of a family remained strictly loyal to one another, they were considered responsible for crimes committed by any member due to guilt by association. It also provided the argument that the entire family would be responsible in supporting each other in the case of a rebellion against a ruler.

The Chinese character 族 can be translated by its original definition of "clan" or "tribe", or it can have the additional meanings of "kinship", "family" (as in 家族), or "ethnicity" (as in 民族).

See also 
 Burning of books and burying of scholars
 Chinese social relations
 Frankpledge
 Nine bestowments
 Number nine in Chinese culture
 Ren (Confucianism)
 Sippenhaft – a similar concept in German history
 Ten Abominations

References

Further reading
Ma Zhongqi (馬重奇), Zhou Liying (周麗英). A discussion of historical Chinese culture 《中國古代文化知識趣談》. Daoshi Publishing Company, 2002. .

Capital punishment in China
Collective punishment
Execution methods
Family murders
History of ancient China
History of Korea
History of Vietnam